Pavel Mikhailovich Fitin (28 December 1907   24 December 1971) was a Soviet intelligence officer (INO–GUGB–NKVD–NKGB) who was the director of Soviet intelligence during World War II, identified in the Venona cables under the code name "Viktor."

Early life and education 
He was born into a Russian peasant family. In 1932 Fitin graduated from the Timiryazev Agricultural Academy, completing the program in agricultural engineering. In 1932-1934 he worked as an editor for the State Publishing House of Agricultural Literature. In 1934-1935 he served in the Red Army. In 1935 he continued his work in the State Publishing House of Agricultural Literature, and in 1936 he was appointed deputy chief editor of this publishing house. In 1938 he passed a training course in foreign intelligence at SHON, the foreign intelligence training school, located in Barvikha, near Moscow.

NKVD Deputy Head 
Fitin became deputy chief of the NKVD's foreign intelligence in 1938, then a year later at the age of thirty-one became chief, with the rank of Lieutenant General.  The Russian Foreign Intelligence Service credits Fitin with rebuilding the depleted foreign intelligence department after Stalin's Great Purge. Fitin also is credited with providing ample warning of the German invasion (Operation Barbarossa) of 22 June 1941 that began the German-Soviet War.  Only the actual invasion saved Fitin from execution for providing the head of the NKVD, Lavrentiy Beria, with information that the General Secretary of the CPSU, Joseph Stalin did not want to believe. Beria retained Fitin as chief of foreign intelligence until the war ended, but demoted him.

Fitin thought it was important to build up a network of spies inside the Manhattan Project. However, at the beginning he was mainly reliant on  Klaus Fuchs. Fitin gave the project the codename "Enormoz". In November 1944 he reported: "Despite participation by a large number of scientific organization and workers on the problem of Enormoz in the U.S., mainly known to us by agent data, their cultivation develops poorly. Therefore, the major part of data on the U.S. comes from the station in England. On the basis of information from London station, Moscow Center more than once sent to the New York station a work orientation and sent a ready agent, too (Klaus Fuchs)."

Another important source was John Cairncross. Pavel Fitin reported to Vsevolod Merkulov: "Valuable information on Enormoz is coming from the London station. The first materials on Enormoz were received in late 1941 from our source List (John Cairncross), containing valuable and absolutely secret documents both on the substance of the Enormoz problem and on measures by the British government to organize and develop work on the problem of atomic energy in our country. In connection with American and Canadian work on Enormoz, materials describing the state and progress of work in three countries - England, the U.S., and Canada - are all coming from the London station."

Dishonored Discharge 
After Beria was executed in 1953, Fitin was discharged from the NKVD and denied his pension. Fitin was unable to find employment until 1959.

Honors 
Fitin attained the rank of lieutenant-general, and was awarded the Order of the Red Banner  twice, the Order of the Red Star, the Red Banner of Tuva and  Order of the Republic of the Tuvan People's Republic.

Legacy 

In 1942, Joseph Stalin appointed Pavel Sudoplatov to head the intelligence work on the Manhattan Project, and to coordinate the data gathered by Soviet agents in England, Canada, and the United States. Most cables sent via the New York – Moscow connection were sent by KGB officer Leonid Kvasnikov, known as Anton, to Lieutenant General Pavel Mikhailovich Fitin, known as Viktor, who had been the head of the foreign intelligence section of the KGB at that time (NSA 2/9/44).

See also 

Venona Project
KGB

Notes

References
 Pavel Fitin's Memoirs: Overview of Soviet Intelligence in World War II. 
 NSA VENONA PROJECT
 NSA VENONA PROJECT DOCUMENT ON FITIN
 Foreign Intelligence Service bio in Russian.

 John Earl Haynes and Harvey Klehr, Venona: Decoding Soviet Espionage in America (New Haven: Yale University Press, 1999)
 Vladimir Chikov, Stalin’s Atomic Spies: KGB File N. 13676 [Unpublished American Edition of Comment Staline a Volé la Bombe Atomique Aux Américains: Dossier KGB no 13676], trans and afterword by Gary Kern (1995)

External links
  Pavel Fitin

Nuclear weapons program of the Soviet Union
Commissars 3rd Class of State Security
KGB officers
Fitin, Paval
1907 births
1971 deaths
People from Tobolsk Governorate
Recipients of the Order of the Red Banner
Recipients of the Order of the Red Star
People's commissars and ministers of the Kazakh Soviet Socialist Republic